The 1991–92 Scottish Cup was the 107th staging of Scotland's most prestigious football knockout competition. The Cup was won by Rangers who defeated Airdrieonians in the final.

First round

Replay

Second round

Replays

Third round

Replays

Fourth round

Replays

Quarter-finals

Semi-finals

Replay

Final

See also
1991–92 in Scottish football
1991–92 Scottish League Cup

Scottish Cup seasons
Scottish Cup, 1991-92
Scot